Asghar Farhadi (born 7 May 1972) is an Iranian film director and screenwriter. He has received critical acclaim for his international films which focus on the human condition as well as portray intimate and challenging stories of internal family conflicts. His films include the dramas About Elly (2009), A Separation (2011), The Past (2013), The Salesman (2016), Everybody Knows (2018), and A Hero (2021).

Farhadi's films A Separation (2011) and The Salesman (2016) are both recipients of the Oscar for Best Foreign Language Film, making him one of the few directors worldwide who have won the category twice. He also received the Cannes Film Festival Award for Best Screenplay for his film The Salesman. In 2021, he received the Cannes Film Festival's Grand Prix for his film A Hero.

In 2012, he was included on the annual Time 100 list of the most influential people in the world. That same year he also received the Legion of Honour from France.

Early life
Farhadi was born in Homayoon Shahr, a city located in the Isfahan Province near the city of Isfahan. At the age of 15, in 1987, he joined the Isfahan branch office of the Iranian Youth Cinema Society, which had been established for 4 years earlier and he made several short films. He is also a graduate of theatre, with a BA in dramatic arts and MA in stage direction from University of Tehran and Tarbiat Modares University, respectively.

Career

Early films 
At the start of his career, Farhadi made numerous short 8 mm and 16 mm films in the Isfahan branch of the Iranian Young Cinema Society, before moving on to writing plays and screenplays for IRIB. He also directed such TV series as A Tale of a City and co-wrote the screenplay for Ebrahim Hatamikia's Low Heights. In 2003, Farhadi made his feature film debut with Dancing in the Dust. He followed with The Beautiful City, released in 2004. His third film, Fireworks Wednesday, won the Gold Hugo at the 2006 Chicago International Film Festival.

About Elly (2009) 
In 2009, Farhadi directed his fourth film, About Elly, which won him the Silver Bear for Best Director at the 59th International Berlin Film Festival and also Best Picture at the Tribeca Film Festival. The latter film is about a group of Iranians who take a trip to the Iranian beaches of Caspian Sea that turns tragic. Film theorist and critic David Bordwell has called About Elly a masterpiece.

A Separation (2011) 
His film A Separation premiered on 9 February 2011 at the 29th Fajr International Film Festival in Tehran and received critical acclaim from the Iran Society of Film Critics. It earned Farhadi four awards including Best Director (for the third time after Fireworks Wednesday and About Elly). On 15 February 2011, it also played in competition at the 61st Berlin International Film Festival, which received a Golden Bear for best film, becoming the first Iranian film to win that award. In June 2011, A Separation won the Sydney Film Prize in competition with Cannes Festival's winner The Tree of Life, directed by Terrence Malick. It also won the Best Film award at the 2011 Asia Pacific Screen Awards.

On 19 December 2011, Farhadi was announced as being a jury member for the 62nd Berlin International Film Festival, which was held in February 2012.

On 15 January 2012, A Separation won the Golden Globe for the Best Foreign Language Film. The film was also the official Iranian submission for the Best Foreign Language Film at the 2012 Academy Awards where, in addition to being nominated in this category, it was also nominated in the Best Original Screenplay category. On 26 February 2012, A Separation became the first Iranian movie to win the Academy Award for Best International Feature Film, at the 84th Academy Awards. This marked Farhadi as the first Iranian to have won an Academy Award in any of the competitive categories. He was invited to join the Academy of Motion Picture Arts and Sciences in June 2012, along with 175 other members. A Separation also won the César Award for Best Foreign Film and the Independent Spirit Award for Best International Film in 2012.

The Past (2013) 

In 2013, Farhadi's film The Past starring Bérénice Bejo and Tahar Rahim was released. This would be Farhadi's first film in the French language. The film competed for the Palme d'Or at the 2013 Cannes Film Festival. Bejo won the Best Actress Award at Cannes for her performance in the film.

The film received universal critical acclaim. It holds a 93% "certified fresh" rating on review aggregator website Rotten Tomatoes, based on 144 reviews with a weighted average score of 8.2/10 and the site's consensus: "Beautifully written, sensitively directed, and powerfully acted, The Past serves as another compelling testament to Asghar Farhadi's gift for finely layered drama." On Metacritic, the film has a normalized score of 85 out of 100 based on 41 reviews, indicating "universal acclaim".

The film was selected as the Iranian entry for the Best Foreign Language Film at the 86th Academy Awards, but it was not nominated.

The Salesman (2016) 
His 2016 film The Salesman, starring Shahab Hosseini and Taraneh Alidoosti, competed for the Palme d'Or at the 2016 Cannes Film Festival, where it won two awards: Best Actor for Shahab Hosseini and Best Screenplay for Farhadi.

On 26 February 2017, Farhadi won his second Oscar for Academy Award for Best International Feature Film for The Salesman at the 89th Academy Awards. The Salesman had already won the award for the Best Screenplay at the Cannes Film Festival. Following Donald Trump's executive order barring Iranians from entering the country, Farhadi said he would not attend the 2017 Academy Awards, despite being nominated, and then winning, for the best foreign-language film. He announced that two prominent Iranian Americans, Anousheh Ansari and Firouz Naderi would represent him in the ceremony. Anousheh Ansari is famed for being the first female space tourist and first Iranian in space, and Naderi as director of Solar Systems Exploration at NASA. A few hours before the ceremony, he addressed a group of protesters in London via a video link from Iran. The Mayor of London, Sadiq Khan, screened the movie publicly in Trafalgar Square as a celebration of the city's diversity. "This solidarity is off to a great start", he told them. "I hope this movement will continue and spread, for it has within itself the power to stand up to fascism, be victorious in the face of extremism and say no to oppressive political powers everywhere."

After winning the Academy Award for the second time, Farhadi had a prepared statement read by Anousheh Ansari. "I'm sorry I'm not with you tonight", Farhadi's statement read. "My absence is out of respect for the people of my country and those of the other six nations who have been disrespected by the inhumane law that bans entry of immigrants to the U.S. Dividing the world into the us and our enemies categories creates fear, a deceitful justification for aggression and war. These wars prevent democracy and human rights in countries which themselves have been victims of aggression. Filmmakers can turn their cameras to capture shared human qualities and break stereotypes of various nationalities and religions. They create empathy between us and others -- an empathy that we need today more than ever." Prior to the ceremony, all five directors nominated for foreign language film issued a joint statement, obtained by USA Today, that condemned "the climate of fanaticism and nationalism" in the United States, among other countries. The directors – Farhadi, Maren Ade (Toni Erdmann), Hannes Holm (A Man Called Ove), Martin Zandvliet (Land of Mine) and Bentley Dean and Martin Butler (Tanna) – said that no matter which film wins, the Oscar is dedicated to "all the people, artists, journalists and activists who are working to foster unity and understanding, and who uphold freedom of expression and human dignity – values whose protection is now more important than ever."

Everybody Knows (2018) 
In 2018, Farhadi directed his eighth feature film titled, Everybody Knows starring Javier Bardem, Penélope Cruz and Ricardo Darin. The film, a Spanish psychological thriller debuted at the 71st Cannes Film Festival where it played in competition for the Palme d'Or.

At the Toronto premiere of Everybody Knows, the director shared with Ikon London Magazine his plans to "Come to London West End with his play". He said "I know there is a lot of great plays every day. And I wish one day I do a play there. It is not far. It is our plan."

The film has earned critical acclaim earning a 78% on Rotten Tomatoes, with critics praising the two leads, but adding that the film is below Farhadi's usually high standards.

A Hero (2021) 
A Hero is Farhadi's 9th feature film. Alexandre Mallet-Guy co-produced the work. This film was shot in Marvdasht, Iran, and narrates a social theme. In this film, Amir Jadidi, Mohsen Tanabandeh, Fereshteh Sadre Orafaee, Sarina Farhadi and Sahar Goldoust play roles. The film was introduced as the representative of Iranian cinema on October 20, 2021, to compete in the 94th Academy Awards.

In April 2022, The Hollywood Reporter mistakenly reported that Farhadi had been found guilty, when in fact he was indicted, by an Iranian court on charges of plagiarism for allegedly stealing the premise for A Hero from an earlier documentary made by Azadeh Masihzadeh, a former film student of Farhadi. The case is now before the criminal court; if convicted, Farhadi could face up to three years in prison. In October 2022, The New Yorker published an article, which included more information about the case and exclusive interviews with those who had previously worked with Farhadi. Many came forward that Farhadi had also used their ideas or work without asking for permission or giving credit, and often credited himself. Among these people are Farhadi’s former classmate and playwright Ali Khodsiani, Iranian author and playwright Abbas Jahangirian, Iranian director Mani Haghighi, and another former student, Mostafa Pourmohammadi. A Separation’s executive producer Negar Eskandarfar has also accused Farhadi of signing a deal without her knowledge, which she alone had the authority to sign. 

After the film was considered for submission for an Academy Award, she said she felt as if “she had no choice but to write a letter stating that she transferred her rights to Farhadi—and to backdate it, so it appeared as if it had been drafted before Farhadi signed the international contract.” Iranian actress Taraneh Alidoosti, who has worked on four of Farhadi’s movies, has also supported Masihzadeh’s claims, saying that she believes her, and called Farhadi a “premier gaslighter”. Iranian actress Golshifteh Farahani, who has worked with Farhadi on About Elly, also came forward about how Farhadi managed to make her feel “guilty” and advised her to write a letter and ask for forgiveness, stating that she now regrets appearing in public without hijab. She described him as a person who wants to benefit from both sides (the people and the government).

Themes

Social and class structures
 
Farhadi's films present a microcosm of modern Iran and explore the inevitable complications that arise via class, gender, and religious differences. For example, his 2011 film A Separation portrays various intractable conflicts and arguments that force the characters to reflect on the moral grounds of their own decisions.

In her article, "Through the Looking Glass: Reflexive Cinema and Society in Post-Revolution Iran", Norma Claire Moruzzi writes:

The film critic Roger Ebert in his Movie Yearbook 2013 writes this about Farhadi's craft depicting social relations:

In the introduction to her 2014 book Asghar Farhadi: Life and Cinema, film critic Tina Hassannia writes:

In Farhadi's films, Iran is depicted as having a rigid class system that endures across the history of pre- and post-revolutionary Iran. Farhadi films the complexities of everyday life in contemporary Iran, with a particular focus on the ways in which diverse perspectives are embedded within social structures such as class and gender. Farhadi has his own style like "open ending movies", being realistic and "narrative gaps".

Cultural norms
Farhadi's films frequently criticize divisions in Iranian society along class, gender and religious lines. However, they are notable for their subtlety of treatment. Farhadi himself has never rejected Iran, most of his films are deeply rooted in urban Iranian society, and he has frequently expressed his commitment to the country and its people, most notably on the two occasions when he won the Academy Award. When he picked up the award for A Separation, he dedicated the win to the Iranian nation. When The Salesman won the prize a few years later, Farhadi declined to attend the event in protest at the policies of the American administration.

What is less noticed is his veiled criticism of religious standards in Iran. His debut feature Dancing in the Dust opens with the Islamic invocation Bismillahir Rahmanir Rahim (In the name of Allah, the most benevolent, the most merciful) just as a hand cleans a car window to reveal a large statue of a man, situated on a pedestal in a street. Idolatry is forbidden in Islam, and the construction of human statues likewise discouraged in strict interpretations. For his second film, Beautiful City, Farhadi repeated a similar cinematic trick; as a prison microphone blares out the Bismillah phrase, it is revealed that a young man is carving human figurines. Neither film has been released in the West, and they have not been seen as widely as his latter films.

Influences 
In 2012, Farhadi participated in the Sight & Sound film polls of that year. Held every ten years to select the greatest films of all time, contemporary directors were asked to select ten films of their choice. Farhadi's choices are listed below:
Rashomon (Japan, 1950)
The Big Road (China, 1935)
The Godfather (US, 1972)
Tokyo Story (Japan, 1953)
The Apartment (US, 1960)
Three Colors: Red (France, 1994)
Take the Money and Run (US, 1969)
Persona (Sweden, 1966)
Taxi Driver (US, 1976)
Modern Times (US, 1936)

Filmography

Feature films

Television

Awards and honors 

Farhadi is one of a select list of directors who have won the Best Foreign Film Oscar more than once. The others are Vittorio de Sica and Federico Fellini (four times each), Ingmar Bergman (three times), and René Clément and Akira Kurosawa (twice each). The following is a selection of his major awards.

A Separation won the Academy Award for Best Foreign Language Film in 2012, becoming the first Iranian film to win the award. The film was nominated for the Academy Award for Best Original Screenplay.

The Salesman won the Academy Award for Best Foreign Language Film in 2017. However, Farhadi did not attend the 89th Academy Awards ceremony in protest of the U.S. Executive Order 13769.

A Hero won the Hafez Award for Best Director – Motion Picture and Best Screenplay – Motion Picture (both original and adapted) in 2021.

 Honors 

Legion of Honour French (2012)
Foreign Policy Top 100 Global Thinker (2012)

See also
Massoud Farasati
Cinema of Iran
Persian cinema

References

External links

1972 births
Living people
University of Tehran alumni
Tarbiat Modares University alumni
Iranian film directors
Iranian screenwriters
Film people from Isfahan
Silver Bear for Best Director recipients
Directors of Best Foreign Language Film Academy Award winners
Directors of Golden Bear winners
Best Director Asian Film Award winners
Crystal Simorgh for Best Director winners
Crystal Simorgh for Best Screenplay winners
Producers who won the Audience Choice of Best Film Crystal Simorgh
Iran's Book of the Year Awards recipients
Cannes Film Festival Award for Best Screenplay winners
Asia Pacific Screen Award winners